Maidensgrove  is a hamlet above the Stonor valley in the Chiltern Hills, adjacent to Russell's Water common. There is a 16th-century public house called The Five Horseshoes at nearby Upper Maidensgrove. The Chiltern Way and Oxfordshire Way long-distance paths pass close by and the Warburg Nature Reserve is to the south.

External links

Hamlets in Oxfordshire